The Industrial Design Council of Australia (IDCA) was established in 1958 and later became known as the Australian Design Council and then the Australian Design Awards. For over five decades this organisation has been the most active body promoting industrial design in Australia.

See also
 Australian Design Award

References

Design institutions